Brian Richard William Brotherton Howard (born 23 January 1983) is an English footballer who last played as a midfielder for Whitehawk. He made more than 300 appearances in the Football League, and also played for Bulgarian club CSKA Sofia. Internationally, he represented England from under-16 to under-20 level.

Club career

Southampton and Swindon Town
Howard started his career as a trainee with Premier League club Southampton, but he was released in 2003 without making a first-team appearance. He trained with Chelsea, who offered him a contract, but while he was away with the England under-20 team, the club was taken over by Roman Abramovich and several top players were signed. Howard chose to turn down Chelsea's offer, preferring the prospect of playing regularly in a lower division, and signed a one-year deal with Division Two (third-tier) club Swindon Town. Howard made his Football League debut on 9 August in a 3–2 home defeat against Sheffield Wednesday, and scored his first Swindon goal on 1 October, an 89th-minute equaliser against Luton Town. In his first season, Howard scored four goals from 41 appearances in all competitions as Swindon lost to Brighton & Hove Albion in the play-off semifinals.

Howard's contract was extended for a further year ahead of the 2004–05 season. He was used in a more central role in midfield rather than on the wing, a change which pleased the player. As Swindon finished in mid-table, Howard finished the season with six goals from 42 appearances, having missed the last three games of the season with a broken bone in his foot. Budget restrictions meant manager Andy King chose not to offer Howard a new contract; he expressed his disappointment that a team with potential was being broken up because of finance.

Barnsley
Howard had talks with AFC Bournemouth, but signed a two-year contract with fellow League One club Barnsley. He missed the first two months of the season with a broken bone in the foot. After this, Howard became an important member of the promotion-winning team alongside Stephen McPhail in midfield. The pair played in all three play-off games, and Daniel Nardiello's equalising free kick, that took the final against Swansea City into extra time, resulted from a foul on Howard.

In March 2007, Howard was one of three Barnsley players released without charge following arrest in connection with an alleged racially motivated assault. He was named Barnsley's player of the year for the 2006–07 season, as the team successfully avoided relegation, and signed a new two-year contract.

Having acted as captain of Barnsley during much of the 2007–08 season when Paul Reid was out of the team, manager Simon Davey appointed Howard captain on a permanent basis in January 2008. He said it was a "massive honour" to captain a top-half Championship team, and appreciated the trust Davey and the club had in him. That season, Barnsley reached the semifinals of the FA Cup. In the fifth round, Howard scored a 93rd-minute winner to beat Liverpool 2–1 at Anfield. Barnsley eliminated Chelsea in the next round to progress to the semifinal, which they lost to Cardiff City. Howard was named in the PFA Championship Team of the Year.

United manager Kevin Blackwell denied any interest in signing Howard, Davey confirmed no bid had been received from the club, and Sky Sports quoted Howard as saying "I feel I have given great service to this club, and I would like them to recognise that by doing one of two things – either give me the contract I am worth or sell me. And by that, I mean doing me the courtesy of selling me at a realistic price."

Sheffield United
At the end of September, Howard was left out of Barnsley's squad ahead of an expected loan move to Sheffield United, completed on 2 October. He signed on loan until January 2009, with an option to purchase at that time. He made his debut a couple of days later, appearing as a second-half substitute in a 3–0 home victory over Bristol City.

Howard played regularly in the Blades midfield from that point but had to wait until 9 December before he scored his first goal, netting the winner in a 1–0 away win over Nottingham Forest. He joined United permanently on 7 January 2009. He contributed to the club reaching the play-offs, and scored in the semifinal against Preston North End, but was "largely anonymous" in the final as United lost 1–0 to Burnley.

Reading

Howard began the 2009–10 season in Sheffield United's starting eleven, but on 2 September 2009, he signed for Championship rivals Reading on a three-year contract for a fee of £500,000; James Harper went the other way on loan.

He scored his first goal for the club on 20 October against Queens Park Rangers, a late consolation with Reading already 4–0 down. During the match against Derby County on 28 November, Howard suffered mild concussion and a fractured jaw in a clash of heads. He was out for several weeks recovering from surgery to insert metal plates in his jaw. In the FA Cup fifth round against West Bromwich Albion, Howard volleyed over the goalkeeper only to hit the crossbar before scoring a 94th-minute equaliser; Gylfi Sigurðsson's "brilliant curling winner" in extra time put Reading into the quarter-finals for the first time since 1927. He stood in as captain for four matches towards the end of the season while Matt Mills served a suspension.

Howard was sent off against Middlesbrough in September for a late tackle. In mid-March 2011, he was linked with a move back to Southampton. He remained at Reading, making 28 appearances over the season and contributed to their reaching the play-offs, but was an unused substitute in the semifinal second leg and the final, as Reading lost to Swansea City. He then stated that if Reading were unable to give him regular football, he would prefer to leave. Howard spent three months on loan at Championship club Millwall in the first half of the 2011–12 season. He said he expected to leave Reading in the January transfer window, but no move took place, and he was released when his contract expired in June 2012.

Portsmouth
After a pre-season trial with Portsmouth, who were rebuilding a squad after losing all their senior players because of the club's administration, Howard was one of ten players to sign a one-month contract on 16 August 2012. He was named captain. Howard scored his first goal in a Football League Trophy match at home to Bournemouth on 4 September, but was relieved of penalty-taking duties in October after missing twice in a week. In January, Howard was one of a number of players given a week's notice that their contracts would not be renewed, and they duly left the club.

Bristol City
On 15 February 2013, Howard signed a contract until the season's end with Bristol City, taking shirt number 11. His first appearance was as a substitute in the Severnside Derby against Cardiff City the next day, and he made a further five appearances, all as a substitute, before being released at the end of the season.

CSKA Sofia
Howard signed a one-year contract with Bulgarian A Football Group club CSKA Sofia in August 2013. He played 13 games, 11 in the League, before returning to England during the mid-season break.

Birmingham City
Howard joined yet another Championship club, Birmingham City, in January 2014 until the end of the season. After making his debut in a 2–0 defeat at home to Yeovil Town, Howard's first goal for Birmingham, a 48th-minute flicked header from Paul Caddis's cross, opened the scoring at home to Derby County on 1 February; the match finished 3–3. He suffered a broken toe and ankle problems, and after just three more appearances, he was released when his contract expired.

Oxford United
Howard joined Oxford United on 15 September 2014. His contract ran until January 2015 with the option of extending until the end of the season, but played only infrequently and was released in December.

Later career
In January 2015, Howard signed for Conference Premier club Eastleigh until the end of the season. In September 2015, he joined Alresford Town, and by the end of the season had played 18 matches and scored 6 goals in all competitions, with 4 goals from 15 matches in the Wessex League. He moved to Romsey Town for the start of the 2016–17 season before switching in January 2017 to Brighton-based National League South club Whitehawk.

International career
Howard played for England from under-16 to under-20 level. Howard, whose father is from Glasgow, was called up by Scotland manager George Burley for their friendly match against Croatia on 26 March 2008; however he was deemed ineligible by FIFA as he had not registered his availability at a young enough age. Attempts to have the decision overturned proved fruitless.

Career statistics

Honours
Barnsley
Football League One play-offs: 2005–06

Individual
PFA Championship Team of the Year: 2007–08

References

External links

Brian Howard profile at The SaintsHub
Alresford Town profile

1983 births
Living people
Sportspeople from Winchester
English footballers
England youth international footballers
Association football midfielders
Southampton F.C. players
Swindon Town F.C. players
Barnsley F.C. players
Sheffield United F.C. players
Reading F.C. players
Millwall F.C. players
Portsmouth F.C. players
Bristol City F.C. players
PFC CSKA Sofia players
Birmingham City F.C. players
Oxford United F.C. players
Eastleigh F.C. players
Alresford Town F.C. players
Whitehawk F.C. players
English Football League players
First Professional Football League (Bulgaria) players
National League (English football) players
English expatriate footballers
Expatriate footballers in Bulgaria
English people of Scottish descent
Romsey Town F.C. players
English expatriate sportspeople in Bulgaria
Footballers from Hampshire
Wessex Football League players